The Panama Metro is a rapid transit system in Panama City, Panama. It links the south and the east of the metropolitan area to the city center. The metro was inaugurated on April 5, 2014, and it entered revenue the next day.

The Metro was built to relieve the traffic congestion between the city and San Miguelito District and to offer commuters a viable alternative to road transport, as the Metrobus transport system was suffering multiple issues.

The Metro operates seven days a week and 365 days a year. Its hours are Monday-Friday 05:00–23:00, Saturday 05:00–22:00, and Sundays and holidays 07:00–22:00.

The Panama Metro is part of a major "National Master Plan" to improve transportation in Panama City and the west side of the country, which includes the construction of three more metro lines and a light rail line. Two  lines have been built so far.

The  Line 1, serves fourteen stations, with a fifteenth station being planned. Line 2 was opened partially and temporarily on January 14 to 17, 2019 for the week of the World Youth Day and completely and permanently on April 24 the same year; it covers a  route and serves sixteen stations.

San Miguelito is the interchange station for both lines.

History

Line 1

Development

The government of Panama invited tenders for a contract to build the metro system. The governments of Brazil and Taiwan offered to invest on the project. After an exhaustive inspection of all proposals for the construction of the railway system, the Línea Uno consortium, which includes the Spanish Fomento de Construcciones y Contratas (FCC), won the contract.

In October 2009, the POYRY/Cal y Mayor y Asociados consortium won the contract for counseling the project development, and in January 2010, Systra was awarded a contract to create detailed infrastructure designs.

The first phase of the project consisted of planning, cost estimation, and technical feasibility. The second phase consisted of several soil studies, topography, and demand refinings. Both phases were started and executed simultaneously in late 2009.

Construction
In December 2010, the government finally awarded the tender for the construction of the subway. The third and the fourth phases of the project took place between 2011 and 2012 and consisted of the construction of all viaducts and stations and the relocation of the public utilities. The control center that supervises the whole metro operations and the Automatic Train Supervision was provided by Thales, along with the network infrastructure and communication and security solutions including CCTV, telephony, intercom, TETRA radio, visual and audio information to passengers, and fire detection.

By September 2013, construction of Line 1 was 92% complete, which allowed a test run with some of the rolling stock.

Cost
The construction of Line 1 cost $1.452 billion. The authority in charge of the planning, construction, and execution of the project had a budget of $200 million for the year 2012. In December 2011, the Secretaría del Metro de Panamá clarified that the updated cost of the project is  billion, including public utilities relocations and engineering and project management costs.

Early operations
On April 5, 2014, Line 1 was opened, and the first public passenger trips on the new system were carried out. The next day, the line entered active passenger revenue service. In its first year of operations, the system carried 200,000 people per day on average, 25% more than had been expected.

Initially, Line 1 had 11 passenger stations: 5 elevated, 5 underground, and 1 at-grade; 3 more stations were later added. The twelfth station, Lotería, which was the sixth underground station, opened on August 27, 2014. The El Ingenio subway station, located between the underground Fernández de Córdoba station and the first elevated station, 12 de Octubre, was originally scheduled to open in August 2014, but it opened on May 8, 2015.

The original northern terminus station of the metro was Los Andes. However, it was a temporary terminus station since the government had approved an extension of Line 1 to a final elevated station in San Isidro. San Isidro was also originally scheduled to open in August 2014, but it finally opened on August 15, 2015.

Line 2

Development
On May 16, 2014, three different consortiums offered several proposals for the planning, cost estimation, and technical feasibility of Line 2 of the system. After making a detailed inquiry of all proposals, the Metro de Panama secretary announced on July 12, 2014 that the PML2 consortium, which includes the Spanish "Ayesa Ingeniería y Arquitectura", the "Barcelona Metro", and the American "Louis Berger Group," had been awarded the contract. The project was to cost $2.200 billion. It ended up costing only $1.857 billion.

The construction contract was awarded to Linea 2 Consortium, formed by Odebrecht from Brazil and FCC from Spain, the same consortium that built Line 1 of the Panama Metro. Construction officially started in September 2015. Originally, Line 2 had to be delivered in April 2019, but since Panama City was hosting the Catholic World Youth Summit in January 2019, construction was being accelerated, and a new delivery date was announced as December 31, 2018 to serve the one million tourists who were expected to attend the summit. However, in 2018, a month-long labor strike eroded over US$900 million from the annual GDP figure and caused the same amount of losses. That pushed back the delivery date  to the original delivery date. However, the first test ran with 12 trains for 8 hours was conducted on 28 December, with a partial opening on 15 January with five stations for the summit. The line was then closed again and re-opened on the original date. In August 2018, it was announced that Line 2 would operate partially from Corredor Sur to San Miguelito 24 hours a day during the summit. In January 2019, it was announced that Line 2 would open from 18 to 28 January, with five stations operating, including 42 hours of continuous operations on the 26th and the 27th.

Line 2 was formally opened on 25 April 2019.

On 16 March 2023, a branch of Line 2, known as El Ramal, connecting Corredor Sur and Aeropuerto was opened. There are no through trains to Aeropuerto, the trains start at Corredor Sur.

Operations

Line 1
 
Panama Metro's Line 1 runs over a mostly north–south route from San Isidro to the Albrook bus station (where the system's maintenance shop is located). It has 14 passenger stations: 6 elevated, 7 underground, and 1 at-grade.

A complete journey of Line 1 lasts about 25 minutes. It begins its current route at the elevated San Isidro station, north of the city, continuing on viaduct via the original terminus of Los Andes, Pan de Azúcar station, San Miguelito station, Pueblo Nuevo (close to the Estrella Azul factory) to reach 12 de Octubre (the final elevated station), where it enters a trench, towards the underground section of Line 1. It continues its journey through the underground stations of El Ingenio, Fernandez de Cordoba, Vía Argentina, Iglesia del Carmen, Santo Tomás, Lotería, and 5 de Mayo. Finally, it reaches the terminus station, the system's only at-grade station, Albrook, with a bridge connection to the bus terminal and Albrook Mall; it is close to Marcos A. Gelabert Airport, the secondary airport of Panama City.

There are also plans to develop an underground station in Curundú, between the underground 5 de Mayo station and the at-grade Albrook station, to serve future city government facilities that will be built there. It is expected to be constructed sometime after the Metro has been opened.

Operating hours
The Metro operates seven days a week and 365 days a year. Its hours are Monday-Friday 05:00–23:00, Saturday 05:00–22:00, and Sundays and holidays 07:00–22:00.

Rolling stock
Alstom has delivered 19 three-car Metropolis trainsets for the Panamá Metro. The trains were built at Alstom's Santa Perpètua de Mogoda factory in Spain and underwent preliminary testing on the FGC network in Barcelona. Some trains since February 2018 have five cars, instead of three.

The first three trains were shipped from Spain and arrived May 25, 2013. The standard gauge units have air-conditioning, CCTV, and passenger information and can accommodate 600 passengers per trainset. The trains initially consist of three-car sets, but all stations were built to accommodate five-car trainsets in anticipation of expected future ridership demands.

Like most other rapid transit systems in Latin America but unlike other systems in the rest of the Americas, the Panama Metro does not have a third rail. Instead, the trains collect their power from an overhead line system using a pantograph and a rigid I beam shaped overhead rail that runs at 1500 volts DC, with 13.8 KV 60 Hz AC being used for power distribution to the power substations that supply the DC power. The rolling stock is very similar to the Barcelona Metro 9000 Series.

Planned expansion
The metro is eventually planned to extend to 10 lines, as well as a branch line to Tocumen Airport and ITSE, by 2040 or 2035. The first five lines will be metro lines, with the last three tram lines, a metrocable-like system for San Miguelito and a monorail line for the planned city of Panama Pacifico, in Panama Oeste.

Line 1 (metro)
Line 1 will extend by one station to Villa Zaita to the north of San Isidro, and the Curundu station will open in 2024.

Line 2 (metro)
The first phase will run from San Miguelito to Nuevo Tocumen. The first phase of construction took four years. Construction on Line 2 broke ground on October 5, 2015, with construction expected to take 44 months.

The second phase (Line 2A) will then extend the line from San Miguelito to either Parque Urraca or Punta Pacifica, in the south of Panama City. It will be almost completely underground. Line 2A will be only 9 km ilong, but since building a metro line underground costs three times as much as building it an elevated metro line, Line 2A could cost as much as Line 2. The final phase will extend the line by one station, from Nuevo Tocumen to Felipillo. By November 2018, test runs covered the entire length of phase 1. A branch line is proposed that would start on Condado del Rey station and run along the Via Centenario until it reaches MERCA Panama.

Line 2 formally opened on 25 April 2019.

Line 3 (monorail)
Line 3 is planned to have 14 stations and will run from Albrook station to Arraiján, Nuevo Chorrillo to the terminus in Ciudad del Futuro. The total length will be . Negotiations with the Japanese government started in 2012 with President Ricardo Martinelli's visit to Japan In 2014, in a meeting held by Fumio Kishida, Japan's Foreign Minister and Francisco Alvarez de Soto, Panama's Foreign Minister, a joint statement was issued including "Panama City Urban Transportation Line-3 Project." In April 2016, it was announced that Line 3 would be financed by a loan from the Japanese government and use Japanese technology with trains from Hitachi monorail. Line 3 will be built in two phases, with the second phase having its terminus in La Chorrera.

Nippon Koei Co, a Japanese consulting firm, is in charge of project management of Line 3 of Metro of Panama.

It was announced in October 2018 that an agreement had been reached with Hitachi to provide Hitachi Monorail trains and platform screen doors for line 3 at a cost of over US$800 million.  Construction on the line started in 2021 and is expected to be finish by 2025

Lines 4 and 5 (metro)
The final two metro lines, Line 4 and Line 5, will run from Pedregal – Via Israel and Costa Del Este to Obarrio, respectively.

Lines 6, 7, and 8 (tram)
The remaining lines will be tram lines. Line 6 will run from Albrook to Ciudad de la Salud. Line 7 will be oriented toward tourists and will run through the Casco Antiguo district. Line 8 will run from Don Bosco to Villa Zaita.

Lines 9 (monorail)
Line 9 will be a monorail, run through the planned city of Panama Pacifico, and connect with line 3. The remaining line will be a metrocable-like system and run through the district of San Miguelito.

Network map

See also
 List of metro systems
 List of North American rapid transit systems by ridership
 List of Latin American rail transit systems by ridership

References

External links

 El Metro de Panamá – official website 
 Official website for Panama City 
 Panama Metro Map 

 
1500 V DC railway electrification
Railway lines opened in 2014
Rail transport in Panama
Rapid transit in Panama